The 2020 Tournoi de France was the inaugural edition of the Tournoi de France, an international women's football tournament, consisting of a series of friendly games, that was held in France from 4 to 10 March 2020. The four national teams involved in the tournament registered a squad of 23 players.

The age listed for each player is on 4 March 2020, the first day of the tournament. The numbers of caps and goals listed for each player do not include any matches played after the start of tournament. The club listed is the club for which the player last played a competitive match prior to the tournament. The nationality for each club reflects the national association (not the league) to which the club is affiliated. A flag is included for coaches that are of a different nationality than their own national team.

Squads

Brazil
Coach:  Pia Sundhage

The final squad was announced on 18 February 2020. Due to injuries Érika and Geyse were replaced by Antônia and Thaís Guedes on 1 March 2020.

Canada
Coach:  Kenneth Heiner-Møller

The final squad was announced on 25 February 2020.

France
Coach: Corinne Diacre

The final squad was announced on 26 February 2020.

Netherlands
Coach: Sarina Wiegman

The final squad was announced on 24 February 2020.

Player representation

By club
Clubs with three or more players represented are listed.

By club nationality

By club federation

By representatives of domestic league

References

Tournoi de France (Women)